James Truman Wilcox III (born October 15, 1962) is an American farmer and politician from Washington. Wilcox is a Republican Party member of the Washington House of Representatives, representing the 2nd district since 2011.

On March 8, 2018, Wilcox was elected Minority Leader by the House Republican Caucus of the Washington State Legislature, following the retirement of Representative Dan Kristiansen. Wilcox also serves on the House Appropriations, Finance, and Rules Committees.

Awards 
 2014 Guardians of Small Business award. Presented by NFIB.
 2020 Guardians of Small Business. Presented by NFIB.

Personal life 
Wilcox's wife is Kathy Wilcox. They have three children. Wilcox and his family live in Yelm, Washington.

References

External links
 J.T. Wilcox at ballotpedia.org
 James Truman "JT" Wilcox III at ourcampaigns.com
 Wilcox Strategies

1962 births
21st-century American politicians
Living people
Republican Party members of the Washington House of Representatives
People from Thurston County, Washington
Washington State University alumni